The Canton Chinks were a minor league baseball team based in Canton, Illinois. From 1908 to 1913, Canton teams played exclusively as members of the Class D level Illinois-Missouri League, as the 1912 team played as the "Highlanders." Canton hosted home minor league games at Athletic Park.

History 
In 1908, the Canton Chinks were founded as the first minor league baseball team in Canton, joining the newly formed Class D level Illinois-Missouri League. The Canton Chinks moniker derived from Canton being named after a Chinese city, as is nearby Pekin, Illinois. Relatedly, Pekin High School in the region used the same moniker until 1981, when the slur was deemed offensive and replaced.

In their first season of play, Canton finished the 1908 season with a 56–61 record, placing 4th in the Illinois–Missouri League standings, playing under manager Chuck Murphy. The charter members in the 1908 six–team league standings were the Canton Chinks (56–61), Galesburg Hornets (50–67), Hannibal Cannibals (68–49), Havana Perfectors (58–61), Macomb Potters (66–53) and Monmouth Browns (55–62).

In the 1909 Illinois–Missouri League standings, Canton placed 5th in the six–team league, finishing 27.5 games behind the champion Monmouth Browns. Canton finished with a regular season record of 51–79, playing under manager Harry Lloyd.  Canton 1909 home season attendance at Athletic Park was 30,000, an average of 462 per home contest.

On August 18, 1909, Canton pitcher Charles Fanning threw a losing no–hitter against the Macomb Potters, as Canton lost the game 2–0.

In 1910, Canton finished 3rd in Illinois–Missouri League play, ending the season 13.0 games behind the 1st place Pekin Celestials. Canton had a 55–62 record playing under managers Elmer Smith and M. McDonald. The Macomb Potters and Jacksonville Jacks folded during the season, leaving four teams to finish the season in the Illinois–Missouri League.

The Illinois–Missouri League again was a six–team league in 1911. Canton had a 60–62 record playing in the 1911 Illinois–Missouri League, which remained a Class D level league. Canton placed 4th in the league standings, playing the season under manager Blackie Wilson and finishing 10.5 games behind the first place Clinton Champs.
 
In 1912, Canton played as the Canton Highlanders. Continuing play in the Illinois–Missouri League, Canton finished with a record of 57–56. The Highlanders placed 3rd in the Illinois–Missouri League, finishing 11.0 games behind the champion Lincoln Abes.

Canton returned to the Canton "Chinks" moniker in 1913, before folding midway through their final season. After beginning play in the six–team Class D level Illinois–Missouri League, Canton folded on July 10, 1913 with a 20–26 record under manager Ted Raines. The neighboring Pekin Celestials also folded on July 10, 1913, leaving the league with four teams to complete the season.

Canton was without a minor league team until the 1952 Canton Citizens played a partial season as members of the Class D level Mississippi-Ohio Valley League.

The ballpark
The Canton minor league teams hosted 1908 to 1913 home minor league games at Athletic Park. Today, the Canton Athletic Park is still in use. The park is located at 900 First Avenue Canton, Illinois.

Timeline

Year–by–year records

Notable alumni

Jerry Akers (1912)
Joe McManus (1910–1911)
Paul Smith (1910)

See also
Canton Chinks players

References

External links
Canton, IL - Baseball Reference

Defunct minor league baseball teams
Professional baseball teams in Illinois
Defunct baseball teams in Illinois
Baseball teams established in 1908
Baseball teams disestablished in 1913
Canton, Illinois
Fulton County, Illinois
Illinois-Missouri League teams